Mathematica Inc., formerly Mathematica Policy Research, is an American research organization and consulting company headquartered in Princeton, New Jersey. The company provides data science, social science, and technological services for social policy initiatives. Mathematica employs approximately 1,600 researchers, analysts, technologists, and practitioners in nine offices across the United States: Princeton, New Jersey; Cambridge, Massachusetts; Chicago, Illinois; Washington, DC; Ann Arbor, Michigan; Seattle, Washington; Woodlawn, Maryland; Tucson, Arizona and Oakland, California. In 2018, the company acquired EDI Global, a data research company based in the United Kingdom and Africa. Mathematica's clients include federal agencies, state and local governments, foundations, universities, private-sector companies, and international organizations.

History
Samuel G. Barton founded the Industrial Surveys Company in the late 1930s. His company later became Market Research Corporation of America. The latter formed a unit named Mathematica, which in 1969 "was spun off ... to allow for faster growth." Oskar Morgenstern was the first chairman of Mathematica, Inc.

Mathematica had three divisions:
 Mathematica Products Group – best known for developing RAMIS (software).
 MathTech, the company's technical and economic consulting group – "research projects and computer systems other than Ramis.".
 Mathematica Policy Research (MPR). This unit's strength was in "social experiments and surveys." In 1983 MPR reported "a major survey assignment for the American Medical Association."

A quarter of a century after Mathematica's founding, it "was largely owned by a group of  professors in Mathematics and Economics at Princeton University ... as this group aged, they opted to cash out by selling." The result was a 3-way split:
 Mathematica, now employee-owned, is the only unit still carrying the Mathematica name.
 Mathematica Products Group was sold in 1983, eventually becoming part of Computer Associates.
 MathTech was described as "a Washington-area educational consulting firm shortly after becoming, in 1986, an employee-owned company.

Research
In 1968, the pre-split Mathematica company conducted the first social policy experiment in the United States, the New Jersey Income Maintenance Experiment (an experimental study of a negative income tax), to test ways of encouraging low-income individuals to work.

In 1975, it was incorporated under its present name, as part of Mathematica, Inc. In 1986, the firm became employee-owned, and the only firm using the Mathematica name.

MPR became known for its large-scale random assignment evaluations of policies and programs such as abstinence education and Job Corps.

Research centers
In early 1995, Mathematica formed a research affiliate, the Center for Studying Health System Change, which provides objective analyses of how the country’s changing health care system affects individuals and families.

In 2007, the company launched the Center for Studying Disability Policy (CSDP), to inform disability policy formation with rigorous, objective research, and data collected from the people disability policy aims to serve. CSDP provides leadership and support for disability research and data collection conducted by Mathematica.

In early 2008, Mathematica created the Center for Improving Research Evidence (CIRE),  to identify, assess, and disseminate results from quality, rigorous research to inform evidence-based policymaking. CIRE also provides technical assistance in designing, conducting, assessing, and using a range of scientific policy research and evaluations to support a growing national and international research base.

In 2010, Mathematica established the Center on Health Care Effectiveness (CHCE), a resource for policymakers, the public, and other stakeholders.

In 2013, Mathematica established the Center for International Policy Research and Evaluation (CIPRE). Its focus is to provide research-based information to funders and policymakers addressing global development issues.

Structure
Mathematica operates three business divisions: health, human services, and international research. Today, the company centers on research consultation for policy topics including disability, early childhood, education, family support, health, international, labor, and nutrition. The company specializes in program evaluation, policy analysis, survey design, data collection, data management, and interpretation. In recent years, it has begun offering services in data science, design, and visualization.

References

Political and economic think tanks in the United States
Employee-owned companies of the United States